United States Daily (1926–1933) was an American newspaper founded in Washington, DC, by publisher David Lawrence.

History
United States Daily started on March 4, 1926, noted Time (magazine) (a rival national news publication), which stated, "A daily tabulation of Government news, presented without comment or color, it was the dullest newspaper in the land.  To a limited group of businessmen, lawyers, teachers, editors, officials it was also the most useful."

In November 1926, US President Calvin Coolidge praised United States Daily, stating "Making a daily topical survey of all the bureaus pf the National Government, grouping related activities, is a work which will enable our citizens to understand and use the fine facilities the Congress provides for them."

In May 1928, David Lawrence of United States Daily testified before the Federal Trade Commission about lobbying by public utilities.

In July 1931, United States Daily published a half-page ad about its content and its advertising in the New York Sun:   What Makes
A GOOD ADVERTISING MEDIUM? 
   In August 1931, United States Daily published a full-page ad about advertising in the New York Sun.

United States Daily closed in March 1933, unable to sustain itself commercially and dependent on "endowment."

After its closure, Lawrence founded the United States News newspaper, which merged with World Report in 1948 to form the news magazine U.S. News & World Report.  The newspaper claimed that it was "Presenting the only daily record of the official acts of the legislative, executive, and judicial branches of the government of the United States of America."  It was Bureau of National Affairs, Inc. (BNA), founded in 1929 by Lawrence as a subsidiary of United States Daily, that over time became today's Bloomberg Industry Group.

Circulation
At its peak in 1929, the newspaper had a circulation of 40,000 and expanded its news to all US states (48 at that time).

Cost
The cost of subscription started at $10 per year, then $15 and eventually $50.

Staff
Staff included:
 Louis Brownlow, writer (1927)
 Wilhelm Heinrich Detlev Körner, illustrator

See also
 David Lawrence (publisher)
 U.S. News & World Report
 Bloomberg Industry Group

References

External links
 Library of Congress
 Fulton History

Newspapers published in Washington, D.C.
National newspapers published in the United States